Michael Anthony Richards (born July 24, 1949) is an American actor, writer, television producer, and comedian best known for playing Cosmo Kramer on the television sitcom Seinfeld. He began his career as a stand-up comedian, first entering the national spotlight when he was featured on Billy Crystal's first cable TV special. He went on to become a series regular on ABC's Fridays. He made numerous guest appearances on a variety of television shows, such as Cheers. His film credits include So I Married an Axe Murderer, Airheads, Young Doctors in Love, Problem Child, Coneheads, UHF, and Trial and Error, one of his few starring roles.

From 1989 to 1998, he played Cosmo Kramer on Seinfeld, three times receiving the Primetime Emmy Award for Outstanding Supporting Actor in a Comedy Series. During the run of Seinfeld, he made a guest appearance in Mad About You. After Seinfeld, he starred in his own sitcom, The Michael Richards Show, which was cancelled after 2 months.

When Seinfeld ended in 1998, Richards returned to stand-up comedy. He incited controversy in 2006 after a video was obtained by TMZ of him going on a racist tirade against hecklers while performing at the Laugh Factory. The incident severely damaged his career, and due to significant media coverage of the event, he announced his retirement from stand-up in early 2007. In 2009 he appeared as himself in the seventh season of Curb Your Enthusiasm—alongside his fellow Seinfeld cast members for the first time since that show’s finale—lampooning his incident at the Laugh Factory. In 2013, he portrayed Frank in the sitcom Kirstie, which was cancelled after one season.

Early life

Richards was born in Culver City, California, to a Catholic family. He is the son of Phyllis (née Nardozzi), a medical records librarian of Italian descent, and William Richards, an electrical engineer of Scottish and English descent. His father died in a car crash when Michael was two and his mother never remarried.

Richards graduated from Thousand Oaks High School. In 1968, he appeared as a contestant on The Dating Game, but was not chosen for the date. He was drafted into the United States Army in 1970. He trained as a medic and was stationed in West Germany where he was a member of a theatrical group called The Training Road Show.  He became interested in performing after taking a theatrical class in seventh grade.

After being honorably discharged, he used the benefits of the G.I. Bill to enroll in the California Institute of the Arts, and received a BA degree in drama from The Evergreen State College in 1975. He also had a short-lived improv act with Ed Begley Jr. During this period, he enrolled at Los Angeles Valley College and continued to appear in student productions.

Career
Richards got his big TV break in 1979, appearing in Billy Crystal's first cable TV special. In 1980, he began as one of the cast members on ABC's Fridays television show, where Larry David was a fellow cast member and writer. It included a famous instance where Andy Kaufman refused to deliver his scripted lines, leading Richards to bring the cue cards on screen to Kaufman, causing him to throw his drink into Richards's face before a small riot ensued (Richards later claimed he was in on the joke). The film Man on the Moon featured a re-enactment of the Andy Kaufman incident where Richards was portrayed by actor Norm Macdonald (although he is never referred to by name, so he could be seen as a composite character taking the place of Richards).

In 1986, Richards had a minor role in the cult satirical TV miniseries Fresno, playing one of a pair of inept criminal henchmen. In 1989, Richards had a supporting role in "Weird Al" Yankovic's comedy film UHF as janitor Stanley Spadowski. On television, he appeared in Miami Vice as an unscrupulous bookie; in St. Elsewhere as a television producer making a documentary about Dr. Mark Craig; in Cheers as a character trying to collect on an old bet with Sam Malone; and made several guest appearances with Jay Leno as an accident-prone fitness expert.

According to an interview with executive producer David Hoberman, ABC first conceived the series Monk as a procedural police comedy with an Inspector Clouseau-like character suffering from obsessive-compulsive disorder. Hoberman said ABC wanted Richards to play Adrian Monk, but he turned it down.

Seinfeld

In 1989, Richards was cast as Cosmo Kramer in the NBC television series Seinfeld, created by fellow Fridays cast member Larry David and comedian Jerry Seinfeld. Although it got off to a slow start, by the mid-1990s it had become one of the most popular sitcoms in television history. It ended its nine-year run in 1998 at No. 1 in the Nielsen ratings. In Seinfeld, Kramer is the across the hall neighbor of the show's eponymous character, and is usually referred to only by his last name. His first name, Cosmo, was revealed in the sixth-season episode "The Switch".

Richards won more Emmys than any other Seinfeld cast member, taking home the award for Outstanding Supporting Actor in a Comedy Series in 1993, 1994, and 1997.

Starting in 2004, he and his fellow Seinfeld cast members provided interviews and audio commentaries for the Seinfeld DVDs. Richards stepped down from providing audio commentary after Season5, though he continued to provide interviews.

The Michael Richards Show
In 2000, after the end of Seinfeld, Richards began work on a new series for NBC, his first major project since Seinfelds finale. The Michael Richards Show, for which Richards received co-writer and co-executive producer credits, was conceived as a comedy/mystery starring Richards as a bumbling private investigator. When the first pilot failed with test audiences, NBC ordered that the show be retooled into a more conventional, office-based sitcom before its premiere. After a few weeks of poor ratings and negative reviews, it was cancelled.

2006 Laugh Factory incident 
During a performance on November 17, 2006, at the Laugh Factory in Hollywood, California, Richards launched into a racist rant in response to repeated heckling and interruptions from a small group of Black and Hispanic audience members. Richards was recorded shouting "He's a nigger!" several times and making references to lynching and the Jim Crow era. Kyle Doss, a member of the group that Richards addressed, said the group had arrived in the middle of the performance and were "being a little loud". According to Doss:

Three days after the incident, Richards made a public apology via satellite on the Late Show with David Letterman, saying: "For me to be at a comedy club and to flip out and say this crap, I'm deeply, deeply sorry. I'm not a racist, that's what's so insane about this." Many studio audience members laughed as Richards began his unscripted explanation and apology, thinking it was a bit, leading show guest Jerry Seinfeld to reprimand them, saying: "Stop laughing. It's not funny." Richards said he had been trying to defuse the heckling by being even more outrageous, but it had backfired. He later called civil rights leaders Al Sharpton and Jesse Jackson to apologize. He also appeared as a guest on Jackson's syndicated radio show. Doss stated that he did not accept Richards's apology, saying: "If he wanted to apologize, he could have contacted ... one of us out of the group. But, he didn't. He apologized on camera just because the tape got out."

The incident was parodied on several TV shows, including Mad TV, Family Guy, South Park, Extras, and Monday Night Raw. In an episode of Curb Your Enthusiasm, Richards appeared as himself and poked fun at the incident. In 2008, rapper Wale referenced the incident and used recordings of the incident, as well as Richard's apology, in the song "The Kramer" on the The Mixtape About Nothing album. In a 2012 episode of Seinfeld's web series Comedians in Cars Getting Coffee, Richards explained that the outburst still haunted him, and was a major reason for his retirement from stand-up.

Comedian Paul Mooney also cited the incident as a key factor leading to his decision to remove the racial slur from his own live performances.

Cameo roles, guest appearances, and film roles
Richards played himself in Episode2 of Season1 "The Flirt Episode" (1992) of the HBO series The Larry Sanders Show. He also had a cameo role in the comedy thriller film So I Married an Axe Murderer, credited as "insensitive man". He played radio station employee Doug Beech in Airheads, and co-starred with Jeff Daniels as an actor pretending to be a lawyer in 1997's Trial and Error. He also made guest appearances on Miami Vice, Night Court and Cheers. In 2007, he voiced character Bud Ditchwater in the animated film Bee Movie, which starred and was produced by Jerry Seinfeld. In 2009, Richards and the other main Seinfeld cast members appeared in the seventh season of Curb Your Enthusiasm. In 2012, Richards appeared in comedy web series Comedians in Cars Getting Coffee, hosted by Jerry Seinfeld.<ref>{{cite web|title=Richards appears on Comedians in Cars Getting Coffee|url=http://comediansincarsgettingcoffee.com/michael-richards-its-bubbly-time-jerry/|access-date=October 7, 2012|url-status=dead|archive-url=https://web.archive.org/web/20121002001805/http://www.comediansincarsgettingcoffee.com/michael-richards-its-bubbly-time-jerry/|archive-date=October 2, 2012}}</ref> In 2014, he appeared as the president of Crackle in a trailer for Season5. Seinfeld said the trailer's storyline would be expanded on in one of the episodes. In the comedy book SuperMega Saves the Troops written by Matt Watson and Ryan Magee, Michael Richards was a key character as an undercover spy.

Richards played Frank in the sitcom Kirstie'', costarring Kirstie Alley and Rhea Perlman. It premiered on TV Land on December 4, 2013 and was canceled after one season.

In 2019, Richards played Daddy Hogwood in the romantic comedy Faith, Hope & Love starring Peta Murgatroyd and Robert Krantz.

Personal life
Richards was married to Cathleen Lyons, a family therapist, for 18 years. They have one daughter, Sophia. They separated in 1992 and divorced the following year.

In 2010, Richards married his girlfriend Beth Skipp. They have been together since 2002 and have one son.

Richards is a Freemason.

Filmography

Film

Television

References

External links

1949 births
20th-century American comedians
20th-century American male actors
21st-century American comedians
21st-century American male actors
American Freemasons
American male comedians
American male film actors
American male television actors
American male voice actors
American people of English descent
American people of Italian descent
American people of Scottish descent
American sketch comedians
American stand-up comedians
California Institute of the Arts alumni
Combat medics
Comedians from Los Angeles County
Evergreen State College alumni
Living people
Los Angeles Valley College people
Male actors from California
Male actors from Los Angeles County, California
Military personnel from California
Outstanding Performance by a Supporting Actor in a Comedy Series Primetime Emmy Award winners
People from Culver City, California
Race-related controversies in stand-up comedy
United States Army soldiers